The United Nations Educational, Scientific and Cultural Organization (UNESCO) designates World Heritage Sites of outstanding universal value to cultural or natural heritage which  have been nominated by countries which are signatories to the UNESCO World Heritage Convention, established in 1972. Cultural heritage consists of monuments (such as architectural works, monumental sculptures, or inscriptions), groups of buildings, and sites (including archaeological sites). Natural features (consisting of physical and biological formations), geological and physiographical formations (including habitats of threatened species of animals and plants), and natural sites which are important from the point of view of science, conservation or natural beauty, are defined as natural heritage. Slovenia, following the declaration of independence from Yugoslavia on 25 June 1991, ratified the convention on 5 November 1992.

, there are five sites in Slovenia on the list and a further four on the tentative list. The first site in Slovenia to be added to the list was Škocjan Caves, at the 10th UNESCO session in 1986. In the 2010s, three more sites were added, all of them transnational entries: pile dwellings at Ig, part of the Prehistoric pile dwellings around the Alps transnational site, in 2011, Idrija, as part of the transnational site Heritage of Mercury. Almadén and Idrija, in 2012, and two forest reserves, the Krokar and Snežnik–Ždrocle Virgin Forests in 2017, as a part of the extension to the site of Primeval Beech Forests of the Carpathians and the Ancient Beech Forests of Germany. The most recent site added were the works of Jože Plečnik in Ljubljana, in 2021. Of these five sites, Škocjan Caves and the Primeval Beech Forests are natural sites while the other three are cultural sites, as determined by the organization's selection criteria.

World Heritage Sites 
UNESCO lists sites under ten criteria; each entry must meet at least one of the criteria. Criteria i through vi are cultural, and vii through x are natural.

Tentative list 
In addition to the sites on the World Heritage list, member states can maintain a list of tentative sites that they may consider for nomination. Nominations for the World Heritage list are only accepted if the site was previously listed on the tentative list. , Slovenia recorded four sites on its tentative list.

See also 
 Tourism in Slovenia

References 

 
Slovenia
World Heritage Sites